Teges may refer to:

 Teges, an individual from Tegea
 Teges, Clay County, Kentucky
 Griffithsia teges, a species in the alga genus Griffithsia
 Polysiphonia teges, a species in the alga genus Polysiphonia
 Teges Satriaji Cahyo Hutomo, an Indonesian tennis player; see Indonesian National Badminton Championships